Standen House is an English country house located  south of Newport, Isle of Wight. The 18th-century house has a brick front and features seven-bay windows, a porch with Doric columns, and triglyph frieze.  Made of brick, it is located at the base of Pan Down. To its right is situated the park of Gatcombe, which itself lies in a valley which includes the winding River Medina. Gatcombe House lies opposite Standen House, separated by the river and woods. Great East Standen Manor is nearby.

References

Houses completed in the 18th century
Country houses on the Isle of Wight
Grade II* listed buildings on the Isle of Wight